Rodney York Nuckey (26 June 1929 in Wood Green, London – 29 June 2000 in Manila, Philippines) was a British racing driver from England.  He started in 500cc Formula 3. He entered two Formula One World Championship Grands Prix, debuting on 2 August 1953, although his place in the 1954 British Grand Prix was ultimately taken by Eric Brandon.  Nuckey scored no championship points, but he finished third in the non-championship Syracuse Grand Prix in 1953, and took part in many other non-Championship Formula One races.

Complete Formula One World Championship results
(key)

References

External links 
 Rodney Nuckey profile at The 500 Owners Association

English racing drivers
English Formula One drivers
1929 births
2000 deaths